Dzyanis Parechyn (born 17 November 1979) is a retired Belarusian professional footballer.

External links

1979 births
Living people
Belarusian footballers
FC Naftan Novopolotsk players
FC Granit Mikashevichi players
Association football goalkeepers
FC Polotsk players
FC Minsk players
FC Torpedo-BelAZ Zhodino players
FC Ataka Minsk players
FC Energetik-BGU Minsk players
FC Dnepr Rogachev players
FC Bereza-2010 players
FC BATE Borisov players